Dąbrowica may refer to:

Dąbrowica, Jelenia Góra County in Lower Silesian Voivodeship (south-west Poland)
Dąbrowica, Wrocław County in Lower Silesian Voivodeship (south-west Poland)
Dąbrowica, Biłgoraj County in Lublin Voivodeship (east Poland)
Dąbrowica, Janów Lubelski County in Lublin Voivodeship (east Poland)
Dąbrowica, Lublin County in Lublin Voivodeship (east Poland)
Dąbrowica, Bochnia County in Lesser Poland Voivodeship (south Poland)
Dąbrowica, Dąbrowa County in Lesser Poland Voivodeship (south Poland)
Dąbrowica, Świętokrzyskie Voivodeship (south-central Poland)
Dąbrowica, Leżajsk County in Subcarpathian Voivodeship (south-east Poland)
Dąbrowica, Nisko County in Subcarpathian Voivodeship (south-east Poland)
Dąbrowica, Tarnobrzeg County in Subcarpathian Voivodeship (south-east Poland)
Dąbrowica, Masovian Voivodeship (east-central Poland)
Dąbrowica, Konin County in Greater Poland Voivodeship (west-central Poland)
Dąbrowica, Turek County in Greater Poland Voivodeship (west-central Poland)
Dąbrowica, Goleniów County in West Pomeranian Voivodeship (north-west Poland)
Dąbrowica, Szczecinek County in West Pomeranian Voivodeship (north-west Poland)

See also
Dubrovytsia, a town in Rivne Oblast, Ukraine, and site of the Jewish shtetl Dombrovza